Walter Jessop may refer to:

 Walter Jessop (cricketer)
 Walter Jessop (surgeon)